Pudendal veins may refer to:

 External pudendal veins
 Internal pudendal veins
 Pudendal plexus